Greenwood Lake Airport  is a public use airport located one nautical mile (2 km) east of the central business district of West Milford, in Passaic County, New Jersey, United States. The airport is owned by New Jersey Department of Transportation. It is included in the National Plan of Integrated Airport Systems for 2011–2015, which categorized it as a general aviation facility.

An old Lockheed Constellation sits on the ramp. This aircraft is no longer flyable, and has been built into part of the terminal building and houses an office for Sky Training LLC.

Facilities and aircraft 
Greenwood Lake Airport covers an area of 150 acres (61 ha) at an elevation of 790 feet (241 m) above mean sea level. It has one runway designated 6/24 with an asphalt surface measuring 3,471 by 60 feet (1,058 x 18 m).

For the 12-month period ending March 25, 2010, the airport had 18,099 general aviation aircraft operations, an average of 49 per day. At that time there were 64 aircraft based at this airport: 91% single-engine, 6% multi-engine, 2% helicopter, and 2% ultralight.

Trivia 
When Jungle Habitat was opened in 1972, the on-field FBO offered aerial tours in Cessna 152 and Cessna 172 aircraft painted with tiger and leopard stripes while avoiding Mountain Hawks.

See also 
 List of airports in New Jersey

References

External links 
 Greenwood Lake Airport (4N1) from New Jersey DOT Airport Directory
 Aerial image as of April 1994 from USGS The National Map
 Satellite photo of Connie on the ramp (Google Maps)
 Jetlink Aviation, a multiengine flight school based at 4N1
 

Airports in New Jersey
Transportation buildings and structures in Passaic County, New Jersey
West Milford, New Jersey